Taxidevontas me tin Magia Tsokli  (Greek: Ταξιδεύοντας με την Μάγια Τσόκλη; English: Travelling with Magia Tsokli) is a Greek television travelling documentary series airing on ERT. The series premiered on 2004 and continued for 8 seasons until 2013. In this series - the follow up to Taxidevontas stin Ellada - Magia Tsokli expands her travels worldwide, from North America and the Caribbean to Asia and Africa.

Seasons & episodes

References

External links

Greek-language television shows
2004 Greek television series debuts
2010s Greek television series